The 1784 Vermont Republic gubernatorial election took place throughout September, and resulted in the re-election of Thomas Chittenden to a one-year term.

The Vermont General Assembly met in Rutland on October 14. The Vermont House of Representatives appointed a committee to examine the votes of the freemen of Vermont for governor, lieutenant governor, treasurer, and governor's council members.

In the race for governor, Thomas Chittenden was re-elected to a one-year term. In the election for lieutenant governor, Paul Spooner was chosen for a third one-year term. No candidate for treasurer obtained a majority. In accordance with the Vermont Constitution, the Vermont General Assembly was required to make a selection. On October 15, the Assembly (Vermont House of Representatives, governor, and governor's council) re-elected Ira Allen to a one-year term as treasurer. The names of candidates and balloting totals were not recorded.

Results

References

Vermont gubernatorial elections
1784 in Vermont
1784 elections in North America